Ancylotropis is a genus of flowering plants belonging to the family Polygalaceae.

Its native range is Brazil.

Species:

Ancylotropis insignis 
Ancylotropis malmeana

References

Polygalaceae
Fabales genera